An apostate is one who renounces their religion.

Apostate or Apostates may also refer to:

 The Apostate (album), a 2016 musical release 
 The Apostate (film), a 2015 Uruguayan film
 Apostates (plant), a genus of flowering plants in the daisy family
 Apostates (moth), a genus of geometer moths
 The Apostate, a story by Jack London 
 The Apostate, a novel by Vladimir Lidin
 The Apostate, a play by Richard Lalor Sheil
 "The Apostate", a song by Swans from the 2012 album The Seer

See also 
 Apostasy (disambiguation)